Sir William Ernest Dunk,  (1897–1984) was a senior official in the Australian Public Service.

Life and career
William Dunk was born in 1897.

He joined the Commonwealth Public Service in 1914 as a Clerk in the Auditor-General's Office. He rose to hold positions including the Assistant Secretary for War Administration in the Department of the Treasury and Director of Reciprocal Land Lease in the Department of External Affairs.

Between 1945 and 1947 he was Secretary of the Department of External Affairs. In 1947, Dunk was appointed chairman of the Public Service Board, succeeding commissioner Frank Thorpe. Well ahead of time, in October 1959, Dunk advised the Australian Government that he wished to retire in early 1961. He retired officially from the chairmanship on 31 December 1960.

After retirement, he was invited to New Zealand to advise the New Zealand Government on public service matters.

Awards and honours
Dunk was appointed a Commander of the Order of the British Empire in June 1953 in recognition of his service as Chairman of the Public Service Board. In 1957 he was made a Knight Bachelor.

In 2009, a street in the Canberra suburb of Casey was named Dunk Street in William Dunk's honour.

References

1897 births
1984 deaths
Australian Commanders of the Order of the British Empire
Australian Knights Bachelor
20th-century Australian public servants